Kellogg Valley is a high hanging valley, for the most part free of ice, between Mount Boreas and Mount Aeolus in the Olympus Range of Victoria Land, Antarctica. It was named by the Advisory Committee on Antarctic Names (1997) after husband and wife glacial geologists Thomas B. Kellogg and Davida E. Kellogg, of the Department of Geological Sciences and the Institute of Quaternary Studies at the University of Maine, who in several seasons over period 1976–90, collaborated in the study of the glacial history of the McMurdo Sound region, including field work on the McMurdo Ice Shelf, Ross Ice Shelf, in the Ross Sea, and the McMurdo Dry Valleys, the location of this valley.

References

Valleys of Antarctica
McMurdo Dry Valleys